John Grayson may refer to:
 John Grayson (cricketer) (1871–1936), English cricketer
 John B. Grayson (1806–1861), U.S Army lieutenant-colonel in the Mexican–American War, later Confederate brigadier general in the American Civil War
 John Grayson (Heroic Publishing), a fictional superhero better known as Icestar